Merab Chanukvadze (born 17 November 1982) is a Georgian politician who served as the Governor of Guria between 2017 - 2018.

Political career
Merab Chanukvadze entered politics in 2013 becoming the Deputy Governor of Guria. In August 2014 he become the Head of Ozurgeti District Administration.

See also 
List of Georgians
Cabinet of Georgia

References

1982 births
Living people
Politicians from Georgia (country)